Great Northern Mall can refer to the following:

Great Northern Mall (New York) in Clay, New York
Great Northern Mall (Ohio) in North Olmsted, Ohio